Shenzhen Metro Line 7 is a line with a length of  and a total of 27 stations. It connects Xili Lake to Tai'an, travelling East–West across Shenzhen in a "V" shape. Construction started on 23 October 2012, with track laying complete in April 2016. The line started service on 28 October 2016.

History

Stations

Staff-only branch
A branch to Wenti Park station is operating. Wenti Park station is a staff-only station.

Extension
Phase 2
It is expected to open before 2025. The extension will be fully underground.

Rolling stock
In 2014, Shenzhen Metro Group purchased 70 trains (420 carriages) from CNR Changchun Railway Vehicles for the future Line 7 and Line 9, in which Line 7 will use 41 while Line 9 will use 29. The first train arrived in mid-March 2016.

References

Shenzhen Metro lines
1500 V DC railway electrification